The 2011 Copa Chile was the 32nd edition of the Copa Chile, the country's national cup tournament. The competition started on May 11, 2011 with the preliminary rounds and concluded on November 16, 2011 with the second leg of the final. The winner qualified for the 2012 Copa Sudamericana.
A new format was used for the teams that was created by the Chilean Leandro A. Shara

Schedule

Teams
A total 76 clubs were accepted for the competition; one club, Juventud Puente Alto, folded before the fixtures were released, leaving 75 clubs in the draw. The teams for this edition were from the Primera Division, Primera B, Tercera Division, Tercera B, regional amateur club champions, and selected amateur teams.

Primera División

Audax Italiano
Cobreloa
Cobresal
Colo-Colo
Huachipato
Deportes Iquique
Deportes La Serena
Ñublense
O'Higgins

Palestino
Santiago Morning
Santiago Wanderers
Unión Española
Unión La Calera
Unión San Felipe
Universidad Católica
Universidad de Chile
Universidad de Concepción

Primera B

Coquimbo Unido
Curicó Unido
Deportes Antofagasta
Deportes Concepción
Deportes Copiapó
Deportes Puerto Montt
Everton

Lota Schwager
Naval
Magallanes
Rangers
San Luis
San Marcos de Arica
Unión Temuco

Tercera División

Deportivo Barnechea
Deportes Colchagua
Deportes Ovalle
Deportes Quilicura
Deportes Melipilla
Deportes Temuco
Fernández Vial
Iberia

Municipal La Pintana
Municipal Mejillones
Provincial Osorno
Provincial Talagante
Pudahuel Barrancas
San Antonio Unido
Trasandino
Unión Santa María

Tercera B

Academia Quilpué
Defensor Casablanca
Deportes Cerro Navia
Enfoque de Rancagua
Ferroviarios
General Velásquez
Independiente de Cauquenes
Lautaro de Buin

Linares Unido
Luis Matte Larraín
Corporación Peñalolén
Deportivo Purranque
Deportes Rengo
Deportes Santa Cruz
Sportverein Jugendland
Deportes Valdivia

Regional teams

Araucanía - Dante (Nueva Imperial)
Atacama - Selección San Pedro de Atacama
Atacama - Juventud Hospital (Chañaral)
Biobío - Estrella del Mar (Lota)
Los Lagos - Quesos Kümey (Río Negro)
Los Lagos - José Miguel Carrera (Purranque)

Los Ríos - Unión Wanderers (Valdivia)
Maule - Favorita (Lontué)
O'Higgins - Deportes Paniahue (Santa Cruz)
Tarapacá - Municipal Pozo Almonte
Valparaíso - Balmaceda (San Antonio)

First round
This round comprised the 2011 Tercera División teams, one regional amateur champion, one invitee amateur team, and the eight winners of the preliminary round.

|}

Second round
The second round was the beginning of the competition for professional teams. This round comprised the winners of the first round, the 2011 Primera B teams and 11 Regional Champions amateur teams.

|}

Third round
The third round marked the beginning of the competition for Primera División teams. This round comprised the winners of the second round and the 2011 Primera División teams. Each team played six games against three rivals. The best 8 teams advanced to the next round.

First & Fourth matchdays

Second and Fifth matchdays

Third and Sixth matchdays

Third Round Table

Quarterfinals

|}

* The first leg of the tie were awarded 3–0 to U. de Concepción after Huachipato was found to have fielded six foreign players.

Semifinals

Finals

Top goalscorers

External links
 Official site of the Copa Chile 

Copa Chile
Chile
2011